Hobe Sound is an unincorporated area and census-designated place (CDP) in Martin County, Florida, United States, located along Florida's Treasure Coast. The population was 13,163 at the 2020 census, up from 11,521 in 2010.

Geography
It stretches along the coast between Port Salerno to the north and Jonathan Dickinson State Park to the south. To the east, across South Jupiter Narrows, is Jupiter Island. Hobe Sound Public Beach, within the town of Jupiter Island, is one of Martin County's four guarded beaches.

History 

Hobe Sound is the anglicized form of the name of a village of the Jaega, a Native American group that lived in the area before European settlement. The Spanish recorded the village name as "Jobe" or "Jove" . Jonathan Dickinson, whose party was shipwrecked near the town in 1696, spelled the name of the village "Hoe-bey".

Parts of Hobe Sound were included in the  Gomez grant given by Spain to Don Eusebio in 1815. In 1821, Gomez sold , including Jupiter Island, to Joseph Delespine for $1 per acre.

Shortly after the turn of the 20th century, Henry Flagler built his railroad along the east coast of Florida, passing through Hobe Sound. This gradually created many opportunities including jobs, the birth of tourism, and other related industries.

During the land boom of the 1920s elaborate plans were announced for Hobe Sound by the Olympia Improvement Corporation.  Their goal was to create a town, in Greek style, where motion pictures could be produced.  Street names bore such names as Zeus, Saturn, Mercury, Mars, Olympus, Venus, Pluto and Athena. For a brief time Hobe Sound was renamed "Picture City" and plans were presented for a movie picture production center. The boom collapsed after the 1928 Okeechobee hurricane, and the original name was restored. Street names remained, however, as did the cement streetlights along Dixie Highway.

In 1924, the building which soon would become the new schoolhouse in Hobe Sound was constructed. The Martin County Board of Public Instruction secured the use of the new school building from the Picture City Corporation in 1925, and in October of that year, the Olympia School opened. The school was designated the "Picture City School" of Martin County. It remained in use as a school until 1962.

Other mementos of the past are gone, including the ice plant, which was south of Bridge Road; the old train station, which now, refurbished and relocated west of Hobe Sound, serves as an office building for Becker Groves; and the Texaco station east of the Winn-Dixie plaza, which no longer supplies gasoline but continues to serve the community with car rentals and a livery service, operated by its founding family.

Hobe Sound is positioned at the southern end of environmentally-sensitive Martin (named after Governor Martin) County.  It has been stated that at Hobe Sound's front door lies the Gold Coast and that at her back door lies the Treasure Coast.  Thus, Hobe Sound can lend to both while retaining its proud heritage and unique personality. Hobe Sound's proximity to the coast affords immediate access to the Atlantic Ocean and the deep-channeled Intracoastal Waterway, a  water route that provides a sheltered passage for boats along the eastern seaboard.

Another significant historical association possessed by Hobe Sound is the brief stay there of former Defense Secretary James Forrestal in 1949 between his resignation from that post and his death.

Around 1:30 a.m. on March 14, 1997, President Bill Clinton fell on the steps and twisted his knee at golfer Greg Norman's 80-acre oceanside estate in Hobe Sound. Clinton was staying there to play in a golf tournament sponsored by Norman.

Hobe Sound is a predominantly wealthy community whose residents have included such celebrities and other prominent persons as "Tiger" Woods, Alan Jackson, Celine Dion, Burt Reynolds, and Marion Margery Scranton, among others. Over the decades, it was home or a winter home for wealthy businessman and industrialists, politicians, and sports and entertainment celebrities.

Police protection for Hobe Sound is provided by the Martin County Sheriff's Department. The Martin County Fire Rescue Department provides modern fire, rescue, as well as EMS Services. State-of-the-art inter-facility EMS services are also provided by the Martin Health System.

Counties
Hobe Sound has been part of the following counties:
 St. Johns County, 1821-1824
 Mosquito County, now Orange County,  1824-1844
 Brevard County, 1844-1866. Note: The present-day Brevard County was known as St. Lucie County from 1844-1855, but it was not the same county as today's St. Lucie County.
 Dade County, 1866-1909
 Palm Beach County, 1909-1925
 Martin County, 1925–present

Demographics

2020 census

As of the 2020 U.S. census, there were 13,163 people, 6,079 households, and 3,397 families residing in the CDP.

2000 census
As of the census of 2000, there were 11,376 people, 5,176 households, and 3,266 families residing in the CDP.  The population density was 2,082.8 persons per square mile (804.5/km2).  There were 6,042 housing units at an average density of 1,106.2 houses per square mile (427.3/km2).  The racial makeup of the CDP was 91.98% White, 5.79% African American, 0.15% Native American, 0.60% Asian, 0.03% Pacific Islander, 0.64% from other races, and 0.81% from two or more races. Hispanic or Latino of any race were 2.22% of the population.

There were 5,176 households, out of which 18.7% had children under the age of 18 living with them, 54.1% were married couples living together, 6.4% had a female householder with no husband present, and 36.9% were non-families. 31.2% of all households were made up of individuals, and 17.0% had someone living alone who was 65 years of age or older.  The average household size was 2.14 and the average family size was 2.66.

In the CDP, the population was spread out, with 16.8% under the age of 18, 4.8% from 18 to 24, 20.5% from 25 to 44, 24.9% from 45 to 64, and 33.0% who were 65 years of age or older.  The median age was 51 years. For every 100 females, there were 93.3 males.  For every 100 females age 18 and over, there were 90.6 males.

The median income for a household in the CDP was $36,541, and the median income for a family was $45,412. Males had a median income of $36,943 versus $27,773 for females. The per capita income for the CDP was $21,603.  About 3.7% of families and 5.5% of the population were below the poverty line, including 3.7% of those under age 18 and 6.0% of those age 65 or over.

Transportation
Travel in Hobe Sound is predominantly performed by private automobile. Hobe Sound is dominated by US 1, a four- and six-lane arterial road that runs north to south. Other important throughways include Florida State Road A1A (locally known as a part of the old 'Dixie Highway'), Bridge Road, Gomez Avenue, and Osprey Street. US 1 arguably represents the central business district though some commercial activity occurs on Dixie Highway (A1A) near Bridge Road.

Mass transit
Martin County Public Transit (MARTY) provides fixed-route bus service through Hobe Sound. Hobe Sound located on MARTY bus route 4 and route 20x. Bus route 20x offers service to Palm Beach County, and connects with Palm Tran bus service. The Community Coach, a service of the Council on Aging of Martin County, is an additional public transportation service for Martin County. It operates a curb-to-curb, advance reservation, shared ride service and also operates fixed-route services in other parts of the county. The closest Tri-Rail commuter railroad station is located in Mangonia Park to the south.

Railroads
The Florida East Coast Railway runs through Hobe Sound parallel to A1A. At-grade crossings can be found at (from north to south) A1A, Osprey Street, Crossrip Street, Pettway Street, Bridge Road, and Gleason Street.

Until 1963 long distance trains, East Coast Champion, City of Miami, Havana Special and South Wind, served Hope Sound's station. Until 1957 the Dixieland, (nee Dixie Flagler) made stops there as well. Until 1968 local Jacksonville to Miami trains made stops at Hobe Sound.

There are plans to extend the high-speed Brightline rail system and add a station in Stuart to the north. Currently, the  West Palm Beach Brightline station is the closest stop to Hobe Sound. The historic West Palm Beach station is also served by Tri-Rail, and is the closest Amtrak stop to Hobe Sound.

Airports
The closest airport to Hobe Sound is Witham Field, and is located in Stuart. This airport is primarily used for general aviation. The closest airport offering commercial service is Palm Beach International Airport.

Education
The Hobe Sound Bible College is the only institution that provides post-secondary education within Hobe Sound. Private schools include the Hobe Sound Christian Academy. Publicly run schools include Hobe Sound Elementary and Seawind Elementary Schools. Residents of Hobe Sound attend Murray Middle School and South Fork High School.

The Pine School (formerly St. Michael's Independent) is now located on its new campus in Hobe Sound. This prestigious private school has a college preparatory program and educational opportunities for Kindergarten through 12th grade students.  The campus offers education covering the basic arts (graphics, music, and media).

Notable people
Ted Cabot, lawyer, politician, and judge
Greg Norman, No. 1 ranked golfer in the 1980s and 90s
Mary Oliver, poet
Nathaniel Reed, Assistant Director Dept. of the Interior
Vanessa Rousso, professional poker player and Big Brother 17 contestant
Marion Margery Scranton, women's suffrage activist, leading member of the Republican Party in the United States, and a member of the prominent Scranton family
Worthington Scranton, businessman, lawyer, and philanthropist, and member of the prominent Scranton family

Sources
 History, Hobe Sound Chamber of Commerce

References

External links
 
 Hobe Sound Chamber of Commerce

 
Census-designated places in Martin County, Florida
Port St. Lucie metropolitan area
Populated places on the Intracoastal Waterway in Florida
Census-designated places in Florida